Bugoye is a small town in Western Uganda.

Location
The town is located in Kasese District, Rwenzururu sub-region, in Western Uganda, within the Rwenzori Mountains, close to the Intentional border with the Democratic Republic of the Congo (DRC). The coordinates of Bugoye are:0°18'18.0"N, 30°06'00.0"E (Latitude:0.3050; Longitude:30.1000).

Overview
Bugoye is an urban center in Kasese District. The town is administered by Bugoye Town Council, an urban local government within Kasese District Administration. Other urban centers in the district include: Hima, Bwera, Mpondwe and Kalongo.

Population
The population of the town is unknown as of May 2014.

Points of interest
The following points of interest are located inside the town or near its edges:
 The offices of Bugoye Town council
 The offices of Bugoye sub-county
 Bugoye Central Market
 River Mubuku - The river courses through town in a general north to south direction.
 Bugoye Power Station - The 13 Megawatt mini-hydropower installation sits in the southern part of the town, close to the main street.
 Bugoye Health Centre III - The health facility is owned by the Uganda Ministry of Health. It is operated in collaboration with Mbarara University School of Medicine and MGH Center for Global Health.

References

External links
  Location of Bgoye At Google Maps

Kasese District
Populated places in Western Region, Uganda